Saeed bin Suroor (born 16 November 1968 in Dubai) is a horse racing trainer in Great Britain. He took out his training licence in 1993 and the following year was appointed as the trainer for Sheikh Mohammed's Godolphin operation.

He has been British Champion Trainer on four occasions.

Major wins
 Great Britain
 1,000 Guineas - (2) - Cape Verdi (1998), Kazzia (2002)
 2,000 Guineas - (2) - Mark of Esteem (1996), Island Sands (1999)
 Ascot Gold Cup - (5) - Classic Cliche (1996), Kayf Tara (1998, 2000), Papineau (2004), Colour Vision (2012)
 Champion Stakes - (1) - Farhh (2013)
 Coronation Cup - (2) - Daylami (1999), Mutafaweq (2001)
 Derby - (1) - Lammtarra (1995)
 Eclipse Stakes - (4) - Halling (1995, 1996), Daylami (1998), Refuse to Bend (2004)
 Fillies' Mile - (1) - White Moonstone (2010)
 Golden Jubilee Stakes - (1) - So Factual (1995)
 Haydock Sprint Cup - (1) - Diktat (1999)
 International Stakes - (4) - Halling (1995, 1996), Sakhee (2001), Sulamani (2004)
 King George VI and Queen Elizabeth Stakes - (5) - Lammtarra (1995), Swain (1997, 1998), Daylami (1999), Doyen (2004)
 Lockinge Stakes - (5) - Cape Cross (1998), Fly to the Stars (1999), Aljabr (2000), Creachadoir (2008), Farhh (2013)
 Nassau Stakes - (1) - Zahrat Dubai (1999)
 Nunthorpe Stakes - (1) - So Factual (1995)
 Oaks - (2) - Moonshell (1995), Kazzia (2002)
 Prince of Wales's Stakes - (4) - Faithful Son (1998), Dubai Millennium (2000), Fantastic Light (2001), Grandera (2002)
 Queen Anne Stakes - (7) - Charnwood Forest (1996), Allied Forces (1997), Intikhab (1998), Cape Cross (1999), Dubai Destination (2003), Refuse to Bend (2004), Ramonti (2007)
 Queen Elizabeth II Stakes - (5) - Mark of Esteem (1996), Dubai Millennium (1999), Summoner (2001), Ramonti (2007), Poet's Voice (2010)
 Racing Post Trophy - (2) - Medaaly (1996), Ibn Khaldun (2007)
 St. James's Palace Stakes - (1) - Shamardal (2005)
 St. Leger - (5) - Classic Cliche (1995), Nedawi (1998), Mutafaweq (1999), Rule of Law (2004), Mastery (2009)
 Sun Chariot Stakes - (1) - Echoes in Eternity (2003)
 Sussex Stakes - (3) - Aljabr (1999), Noverre (2001), Ramonti (2007)
 Yorkshire Oaks - (1) - Punctilious (2005)

 Australia
 Caulfield Cup - (2) - All the Good (2008), Best Solution (2018)
 Caulfield Stakes - (1) - Benbatl (2018)
 VRC Queen Elizabeth Stakes - (2) - Hatha Anna (2001), Fantastic Love (2004)
 Zipping Classic - (1) - Beautiful Romance (2016)

 Canada
 Canadian International Stakes - (2) - Mutafaweq (2000), Sulamani (2004)
 E. P. Taylor Stakes - (1) - Folk Opera (2008)

 France
 Critérium de Saint-Cloud – (1) – Passion for Gold (2009)
 Critérium International - (2) - Thunder Snow (2016), Royal Meeting (2018)
 Poule d'Essai des Poulains - (3) - Vettori (1995), Bachir (2000), Shamardal (2005)
 Prix de l'Arc de Triomphe - (3) - Lammtarra (1995), Sakhee (2001), Marienbard (2002)
 Prix de la Forêt - (1) - Caradak (2006)
 Prix d'Ispahan - (2) - Halling (1996), Best of the Bests (2002)
 Prix Jacques Le Marois - (4) - Dubai Millennium (1999), Muhtathir (2000), Dubawi (2005), Librettist (2006)
 Prix Jean-Luc Lagardère - (2) - Rio de la Plata (2007), Royal Marine (2018)
 Prix Jean Prat - (2) - Almutawakel (1998), Thunder Snow (2017)
 Prix du Jockey Club - (1) - Shamardal (2005)
 Prix Maurice de Gheest - (1) - Diktat (1999)
 Prix du Moulin de Longchamp - (2) - Slickly (2001), Librettist (2006)
 Prix de la Salamandre - (1) - Aljabr (1998)
 Prix Vermeille - (1) - Mezzo Soprano (2003)

 Germany
 Bayerisches Zuchtrennen - (2) - Kutub (2001), Benbatl (2018)
 Grosser Preis von Baden - (3) - Marienbard (2002), Mamool (2003), Best Solution (2018)
 Grosser Preis von Berlin - (4) - Mutafaweq (2000), Marienbard (2002), Campanologist (2010), Best Solution (2018)
 Preis von Europa - (3) - Kutub (2001), Mamool (2003), Campanologist (2011)
 Rheinland-Pokal - (2) - Cherry Mix (2006), Campanologist (2010)

 Hong Kong
 Hong Kong Cup - (1) - Fantastic Light (2000), Ramonti (2007)
 Hong Kong Mile - (1) - Firebreak (2004)
 Hong Kong Vase - (1) - Mastery (2010)
 Queen Elizabeth II Cup - (1) - Overbury (1996)

 Ireland
 Irish 2,000 Guineas - (2) - Bachir (2000), Dubawi (2005)
 Irish Champion Stakes - (4) - Swain (1998), Daylami (1999), Fantastic Light (2001), Grandera (2002)
 Irish St. Leger - (2) - Kayf Tara (1998, 1999)
 National Stakes - (1) - Dubawi (2004)
 Pretty Polly Stakes - (1) - Flagbird (1995)
 Tattersalls Gold Cup - (2) - Daylami (1998), Fantastic Light (2001)

 Italy
 Derby Italiano - (3) - Central Park (1998), Mukhalif (1999), Mastery (2009)
 Gran Premio del Jockey Club - (4) - Kutub (2001), Cherry Mix (2005), Schiaparelli (2009), Campanologist (2011)
 Gran Premio di Milano - (1) - Leadership (2003)
 Premio Lydia Tesio - (2) - Najah (2001), Dubai Surprise (2005)
 Premio Presidente della Repubblica - (2) - Flagbird (1995), Central Park (1999)
 Premio Roma - (3) - Cherry Mix (2006), Rio De La Plata (2010), Hunter's Light (2012)
 Premio Vittorio di Capua - (6) - Muhtathir (1999), Slickly (2001, 2002), Ancient World (2004), Gladiatorus (2009), Rio De La Plata (2010)

 Japan
 Yasuda Kinen - (1) - Heart Lake (1995)

 Singapore
 Singapore Airlines International Cup - (1) - Grandera (2002)

 United Arab Emirates
 Dubai Duty Free Stakes - (4) - Tamayaz (1997), Annus Mirabilis (1998), Altibr (1999), Rhythm Band (2000)
 Dubai Golden Shaheen - (1) - Kassbaan (1996)
 Dubai Sheema Classic - (2) - Stowaway (1998), Sulamani (2003)
 Dubai World Cup - (9) - Almutawakel (1999), Dubai Millennium (2000), Street Cry (2002), Moon Ballad (2003), Electrocutionist (2006), African Story (2014), Prince Bishop (2015), Thunder Snow (2018, 2019)

 United States
 Arlington Million - (1) - Sulamani (2003)
 Ballerina Stakes - (1) - Music Note (2009)
 Beldame Stakes - (3) - Imperial Gesture (2002), Cocoa Beach (2008), Music Note (2009)
 Beverly D. Stakes - (1) - Crimson Palace (2004)
 Breeders' Cup Juvenile - (1) - Vale of York (2009)
 Breeders' Cup Turf - (2) - Daylami (1999), Fantastic Light (2001)
 Cigar Mile Handicap - (1) - Discreet Cat (2006)
 Coaching Club American Oaks - (2) - Jilbab (2002), Music Note (2008)
 Flower Bowl Invitational Stakes - (1) - Kazzia (2002)
 Gazelle Stakes - (2) - Imperial Gesture (2002), Music Note (2008)
 Man o' War Stakes - (2) - Daylami (1998), Fantastic Light (2000)
 Mother Goose Stakes - (1) - Music Note (2008)
 Ruffian Handicap - (1) - Stellar Jayne (2005)
 San Juan Capistrano Handicap - (1) - Red Bishop (1995)
 Stephen Foster Handicap - (1) - Street Cry (2002)
 Turf Classic Invitational Stakes - (1) - Sulamani (2003)

See also
 Racingbase.com - Racing People: Saeed bin Suroor

References 
 BBC Sport Horse Racing profile
 bio at NTRA.com

1966 births
Living people
Emirati horse trainers
Emirati police officers